A near-equatorial orbit is an orbit that lies close to the equatorial plane of the object orbited. Such an orbit has an inclination near 0°. On Earth, such orbits lie on the celestial equator, the great circle of the imaginary celestial sphere on the same plane as the equator of Earth. A geostationary orbit is a particular type of equatorial orbit, one which is geosynchronous. A satellite in a geostationary orbit appears stationary, always at the same point in the sky, to observers on the surface of the Earth.

Equatorial orbits can be advantageous for several reasons. For launches of human technology to space, sites near the Equator, such as the Guiana Space Centre in Kourou, French Guiana, or Alcantara Launch Centre in Brazil, can be good locations for spaceports as they provide some additional orbital speed to the launch vehicle by imparting the rotational speed of the Earth, 460 m/s, to the spacecraft at launch. The added velocity reduces the fuel needed to launch spacecraft to orbit. Since Earth rotates eastward, only launches eastward take advantage of this boost of speed. Westward launches, in fact, are especially difficult from the Equator because of the need to counteract the extra rotational speed.

Equatorial orbits offer other advantages, such as to communication: a spaceship in an equatorial orbit passes directly over an equatorial spaceport on every rotation, in contrast to the varying ground track of an inclined orbit.

Furthermore, launches directly into equatorial orbit eliminate the need for costly adjustments to a spacecraft's launch trajectory. The maneuver to reach the 5° inclination of the Moon's orbit from the 28° N latitude of Cape Canaveral was originally estimated to reduce the payload capacity of the Apollo Program's Saturn V rocket by as much as 80%.

Non-inclined orbit 

A non-inclined orbit is an orbit coplanar with a plane of reference.  The orbital inclination is 0° for prograde orbits, and π (180°) for retrograde ones.

If the plane of reference is a massive spheroid body's equatorial plane, these orbits are called equatorial, and the non-inclined orbit is merely a special case of the near-equatorial orbit.

However, a non-inclined orbit need not be referenced only to an equatorial reference plane. If the plane of reference is the ecliptic plane, they are called an ecliptic orbit.

As non-inclined orbits lack nodes, the ascending node is usually taken to lie in the reference direction (usually the vernal equinox), and thus the longitude of the ascending node is taken to be zero. Also, the argument of periapsis is undefined.

A geostationary orbit is a geosynchronous example of an equatorial orbit, non-inclined orbit that is coplanar with the equator of Earth.

See also 
 List of orbits
 Geostationary orbit (GEO)
 Celestial equator
 Orbital inclination
 Inclined orbit

References 

Astrodynamics
Orbits